Sterling Bank Plc, which is a full service national commercial bank is licensed by the Central Bank of Nigeria. On Reuters and Bloomberg terminals, it is identified as STERLNB.LG and STERLNBA:NL respectively.

The bank provides services to individuals, small businesses (SMEs) and large corporations. As of December 2021, the bank's branch network numbered 141, distributed throughout Nigeria with total assets valued in excess of NGN 1.6 trillion).

History
Sterling Bank Plc originally incorporated in 1960 as Nigeria Acceptances Limited (NAL). The bank was licensed as Nigeria's first merchant bank in 1969. Consequent to the indigenization decree of 1972, the bank became fully government owned and was managed in partnership with Grindlays Bank Limited, Continental International Finance Company Illinois and American Express Bank Limited between 1974 and 1992. In 1992, the bank was partly privatized and listed as a public company on the Nigeria Stock Exchange (NSE). Eight years later, in 2000, the Federal Government sold its residual interest in the bank, effectively making it a fully privatized institution.

In January 2006, as part of the consolidation of the Nigerian banking industry, NAL Bank completed a merger with four other Nigerian Banks namely, Magnum Trust Bank, NBM Bank, Trust Bank of Africa and Indo-Nigeria Merchant Bank (INMB) and adopted the name 'Sterling Bank'. The merged entities were successfully integrated and have operated as a consolidated group ever since.

In line with the Central Bank of Nigeria's repeal of universal banking, Sterling Bank now operates as a national commercial bank, disposing of holdings in subsidiaries and affiliate companies. In mid-2011, Sterling Bank Plc acquired the franchise of the erstwhile Equatorial Trust Bank.

Operations
The bank's operations and products are grouped in four clusters:

Retail & Consumer Banking, Commercial Banking, Institutional Banking and Corporate Banking.

Sterling has launched several initiatives under the Retail & Consumer Banking such as Agent Banking (designed to attract the underbanked/unbanked), Micro-credit for youths and Specta (an automated retail lending platform). Its Commercial Banking deals in several sectors including Agriculture for which the bank has won several awards while its Institutional Banking offers value adding advisory & collection services for government parastatals. Sterling's Corporate Banking covers several sectors including Telecommunications, Power and Steel, Food and Beverages among others.

The bank operates from:
 Head Office  20 Marina, Lagos
 141 branches across the country
 12,383 POS terminals with several merchants
 654 ATMs across the country
 Over 2 million USSD users across the country

Specialised Services
 Private Banking and Wealth Management
The bank also caters to High Net Worth individuals through their Private Banking and Wealth Management arm offering products such as Trust and Fiduciary Services, Philanthropy Management, Investment Advisory, among others.
 Sterling Alternative Finance (SAF) (Non-Interest Banking)
In 2013, the bank was licensed by the Central Bank of Nigeria to provide non-interest banking services after meeting the set criteria. The alternative banking products are split into three facets: Transactional, Investment, and Financing. The bank has set up this arm of business in line with global best practice in this regard by having an Advisory Committee of Experts (ACE) who approve all products and processes while ensuring they are fully compliant with the rules of Islamic commercial jurisprudence. The bank's Advisory Committee of Experts (ACE) includes Sheikh Abdulkader Thomas (US/Kuwait); Sheikh Abubakar Musa (Minna); and Imam Abdur-Raheem Ahmad Sayi (Lagos).

2021 Performance Highlights
Sterling Bank delivered a set of results in 2021 as follows:
	Gross earnings rose by 4.8% driven by a growth of 28.5% in non-interest income.
	Interest expense declined by 8.3%, resulting in a 21.3% drop in the cost of funds. This was driven by a 27.1% y-o-y growth in customer deposits.
	We continue to strengthen our risk management practices, with NPL moderating from 1.9% in 2020 to 0.7% in 2021.
	Cost-to-income ratio y-o-y declined to 75.0% despite a 9.9% increase in operating expenses arising from inflationary pressures and FX risks.
	Our NIP (NIBSS Instant Payments) transaction volume significantly grew by 51.4% compared to the previous year on the back of investments made in our digital platforms.
	Total assets grew by 25.4% to N1,629.1 billion from N1,299.7 billion in December 2020;
	Net loans and advances increased by 19.3% to N711.9 billion (FY 2020: N596.8 billion);
	Customer deposits increased by 27.1% to N1,208.8 billion (Dec. 2020: N950.8 billion);
	Capital adequacy ratio down to 14.8%; well above regulatory threshold.
	Overall, we achieved a 20.2% growth in profit after taxes to reach N13.5 billion; this underpins the 4.2% growth in shareholders' funds recorded as at year-end.

Other Non-Financial Highlights
Other non-financial highlights include:

•       Digital platforms: Pay with Specta; There has been remarkable growth in this digital product. The value of customer transactions grew from 0.35 billion in 2020 to over 36 billion in 2021.

•       Lending platforms: Loan in 5 minutes; The following deals and packages are available from Specta:

Specta Xtreme: There is no need to profile participants in Specta Xtreme because it is open to everyone, including business owners, salaried workers, and others! Up to 2 million Naira can be borrowed with a maximum tenor of one year and an interest rate that ranges from 26 to 30 percent per annum, regardless of the bank you choose.

Specta Basic: The Specta Basic product offers funding of up to 5 million in 5 minutes, a tenor of 4 years, and a rate and repayment date that can be customized. Only wage earners whose accounts are held in Sterling bank are eligible to apply for this. Business owners whose accounts are held at other banks are not eligible.

•       Awarded 2021 ‘People First Organization' by the Chartered Institute of Personnel Management of Nigeria (CIPM).

The bank carries out corporate social responsibility in these areas: education, the environment, health, empowerment, sports development, capacity building, among others.

Board Of Directors

 Asue Ighodalo – Chairman
 Abubakar Suleiman – Managing Director/Chief Executive Officer
 Yemi Odubiyi - Executive Director
Raheem Owodeyi - Executive Director
Tunde Adeola- Executive Director
Ankala Prasad - Non-Executive Director
 Michael Jituboh - Non-Executive Director
 Olaitan Kajero - Non-Executive Director
 Tairat Tijani - Non-Executive Director
Folasade Kilaso - Non-Executive Director
Paritosh Tripathi - Non-Executive Director
Olatunji Mayaki - Non-Executive Director 
 Michael Ajukwu - Independent Director
 Olusola Oworu - Independent Director

Mr. Abubakar Suleiman is the current Managing Director/Chief Executive Officer, assuming this position on 1 April 2018.

See also
 List of banks in Nigeria
 Central Bank of Nigeria
 Economy of Nigeria

References

External links
https://sterling.ng  Sterling Bank (Nigeria) Homepage
 Sterling Bank Plc. Shares Recover From Recession
 Company Profile At Bloomberg.com

Banks established in 1960
Companies based in Lagos
Companies listed on the Nigerian Stock Exchange
Banks of Nigeria
Nigerian companies established in 1960